Hunsecker was originally an anglicized version of the surname, Hunziker.  Hunsecker may refer to:

  Hunsecker, the surname.
  Hunsecker, a community in Lancaster County, Pennsylvania.